Table Hill is situated in the range of Malvern Hills that runs about  north-south along the Herefordshire-Worcestershire border.

History 
Although the flint route from North Wales to Wessex lay to the north of Malvern, there is some evidence to suggest that traders passed over the Malvern Hills. Parts of an arrowhead, a scraper and flint flakes have been discovered between North Hill and Table Hill. A 19th-century guidebook describes both a collapsed burial mound on North Hill, named the Giant's Grave, and a tump on Table Hill. These tumuli may have been connected to the Dobunni settlement in Mathon: 

Upon the Table Hill you will perceive the figure of a large table, whence the name is derived. In the centre is a cross, of the same size as that by the Giant's Grave, upon North Hill.

References

Marilyns of England
Hills of Worcestershire
Malvern Hills
Malvern, Worcestershire